Austin "Red" Robbins (September 30, 1944 – November 18, 2009) was an American basketball player.

Robbins, a 6'8" forward/center from Leesburg, Florida, starred at the University of Tennessee in the 1960s and then played professionally for the American Basketball Association's New Orleans Buccaneers (1967–1970), Utah Stars (1970–1972), San Diego Conquistadors (1972–1973; 1973–1974), Kentucky Colonels (1973; 1974–1975), and Virginia Squires (1975–1976). Robbins was nicknamed for his red hair and perceived fiery personality, and grabbed over 6,000 rebounds in his career. Robbins was also an offensive contributor with a .466 field goal percentage; and led the ABA in three pointer percentage, with a .408 mark, in the 1971-72 season. In Game 7 of the 1971 ABA Western Division playoffs, he made 11 out of 12 field goals to lead the Utah Stars to a 108–101 victory en route to the league title.

Death
Robbins died in Metairie, Louisiana on November 18, 2009, aged 65, after having battled cancer.

References

External links
Career statistics at basketball-reference.com
Player profile at Remember the ABA
Italian League stats

1944 births
2009 deaths
American expatriate basketball people in Italy
American men's basketball players
Basketball players from Florida
Centers (basketball)
Chipola Indians men's basketball players
Deaths from cancer in Louisiana
Kentucky Colonels players
New Orleans Buccaneers players
Olimpia Milano players
People from Metairie, Louisiana
People from Leesburg, Florida
Philadelphia 76ers draft picks
Power forwards (basketball)
San Diego Conquistadors players
Tennessee Volunteers basketball players
Utah Stars players
Virginia Squires players